Akin Busari (born August 20, 1984. in Lagos State, Nigeria), popularly known as Àkin, is a Nigerian singer, songwriter and producer. He is the 2012 winning artist of the African Entertainment Awards in Canada. He is the founder of Influential Music and popularly known for his songs "Harmony", "Nigerian Girl", "Bamijo",  "Omo Ele" and more recently "C'Mon" .

Career 
Akin Busari was born in Ikeja, Lagos State, Nigeria and originates from the Yoruba ethnic group in South-Western Nigeria. He attended Command Day Secondary School and travelled to Canada in 2003 on a computer scholarship with the Canadian Business College. Inspired by artistes like Fela, Tuface and Wyclef, he credits the start of his music career to his mother who loves music and sings about everything.

In 2012, he won best Artist at the African Entertainment Awards in Canada. He won Best Toronto R&B/Soul Song and Best Toronto Hip Hop Song at the Toronto Exclusive Awards in 2009 and Best Toronto R&B Soul Song in 2010, was nominated for the Black Canadian Awards in 2015 and the Independent Music Award for best song under the Sing Out For Social Action for his song "Harmony"

Akin Busari says that his love for music is heavily inspired by significant causes. To him, all it takes to make the world a better place is for everyone to help each other and do their part.

Discography

Singles 

 True Stories (2009)
 Mo So Rire (2011)
 Strength (2012)
 Babylon Soldier (2012)
 Brand New Day ft. J.Robb (2012)
 The Way You Are (2012)
 Radio Killer ft, Yom (2013)
 Beautiful (2013)
 Harmony (2014)
 Nigerian Girl (2014)
 Aja (2016)
 Bamijo (2016)
 Omo Ele (2016)
 Be With You ft. Neza (2016)
 C'mon (2017)
 Official (2017)
 Panana ft. Skales (2018)
Green Light (2018)
Gentleman (2019)

References 

1984 births
Living people
Nigerian male singer-songwriters
Nigerian hip hop singers
21st-century Nigerian  male singers
English-language singers from Nigeria
Yoruba-language singers